In fluid dynamics, Rayleigh's equation or Rayleigh stability equation is a linear ordinary differential equation to study the hydrodynamic stability of a parallel, incompressible and inviscid shear flow. The equation is:

The prime denotes differentiation with respect to

Background

The equation is named after Lord Rayleigh, who introduced it in 1880. The Orr–Sommerfeld equation – introduced later, for the study of stability of parallel viscous flow – reduces to Rayleigh's equation when the viscosity is zero.

Rayleigh's equation, together with appropriate boundary conditions, most often poses an eigenvalue problem. For given (real-valued) wavenumber  and mean flow velocity  the eigenvalues are the phase speeds  and the eigenfunctions are the associated streamfunction amplitudes  In general, the eigenvalues form a continuous spectrum. In certain cases there may further be a discrete spectrum of complex conjugate pairs of  Since the wavenumber  occurs only as a square  in Rayleigh's equation, a solution (i.e.  and ) for wavenumber  is also a solution for the wavenumber 

Rayleigh's equation only concerns two-dimensional perturbations to the flow. From Squire's theorem it follows that the two-dimensional perturbations are less stable than three-dimensional perturbations.

If a real-valued phase speed  is in between the minimum and maximum of  the problem has so-called critical layers near  where  At the critical layers Rayleigh's equation becomes singular. These were first being studied by Lord Kelvin, also in 1880. His solution gives rise to a so-called cat's eye pattern of streamlines near the critical layer, when observed in a frame of reference moving with the phase speed

Derivation

The flow is described using the incompressible Euler equations, which become after linearization – using velocity components  and 

 

Taking the - and -derivatives of the - and -momentum equation, and thereafter subtracting the two equations, the pressure  can be eliminated:

which is essentially the vorticity transport equation,  being (minus) the vorticity.

Next, sinusoidal fluctuations are considered:

with  the complex-valued amplitude of the streamfunction oscillations, while  is the imaginary unit and  denotes the real part of the expression between the brackets. Using this in the vorticity transport equation, Rayleigh's equation is obtained.

The boundary conditions for flat impermeable walls follow from the fact that the streamfunction is a constant at them. So at impermeable walls the streamfunction oscillations are zero, i.e.  For unbounded flows the common boundary conditions are that

Notes

References

Fluid dynamics
Equations of fluid dynamics